Santa Maria dell Quercia is a Renaissance-style, Roman Catholic church located just outside the town center of Mondavio, on the road that leads to the frazione of San Michele al Fiume outside of the town, in the region of Marche, Italy.

History
The church was rebuilt in 1521 at the site of 13th century church. The church has simple exterior with a brick portico. The interior has a chapel with frescoes (1535) depicting a Crucifixion, Madonna and Child with St Roch and Sebastian, and another Madonna and Child attributed to the brothers Presutti (Giuliano Presutti) from Fano. Along the windows are frescoes depicting St Paul and Peter by Ridolfi.

References

Roman Catholic churches in Mondavio
Renaissance architecture in le Marche
16th-century Roman Catholic church buildings in Italy
Roman Catholic churches completed in 1521